Big Brother Australia (also known simply as Big Brother) is an Australian reality show based on the international Big Brother format created by John de Mol. 

Following the premise of other versions of the format, the show features a group of contestants, known as "housemates" who live together in a specially constructed house that is isolated from the outside world. The housemates are continuously monitored during their stay in the house by live television cameras as well as personal audio microphones. Throughout the course of the competition, housemates are evicted from the house - eliminated from the competition. The last remaining housemate wins the competition and is awarded a cash prize.

Big Brother was produced from 2001 and ran for eight seasons and a Celebrity edition on Network Ten before the network cancelled it in July 2008 after experiencing audience erosion and controversy. Big Brother returned in 2012 on the Nine Network. Nine's iteration of the series lasted 3 seasons and was not renewed beyond 2015. In 2019 the Seven Network picked up the series, which is produced by Endemol Shine Australia. All eleven previous seasons were produced by Endemol Australia and Endemol Southern Star. The twelfth season aired in 2020. The series was renewed for a 13th season in June 2020. Seven has also commissioned a new celebrity edition titled Big Brother VIP to air on 1 November 2021.

The Ten and Nine iterations of the series used a compound located at the Dreamworld theme park, on the Gold Coast, Queensland, as the Big Brother House. It has since been abandoned and vandalised. In June 2019, the house was set ablaze and burnt down entirely. The entire compound was demolished by Dreamworld in August 2019. A new Big Brother House located on Sydney Harbour's North Head is used for Seven's iteration of the series in season 12, although this house has since been pulled down following season 13. The following VIP season was filmed at a newly built compound in Sydney Olympic Park. The Season 14 was too filmed at this location.

The series was renewed for a fifteenth season at Sevens 2023 upfronts in October 2022, under the title Big Brother: House of Love.

Format 
Housemates must remain in the house at all times, with the aim of avoiding eviction from the house to be the last Housemate remaining to win a substantial cash prize at the end of the series. Alternatively, housemates can also be removed from the house if Big Brother feels this is necessary, and can voluntarily leave the show at any time. In order to support the housemates' well-being, all participants have access to psychologists and a doctor, at all times. Housemates are filmed 24 hours per day with edited highlights broadcast during prime time slots every evening.

Big Brother
While in the house, the housemates are under the watchful eye of "Big Brother" - the embodiment of the Show's Producers, who will act as an authoritative all-seeing voice of God to the housemates. Housemates are at all times under the control of Big Brother, a rule enforcing authority figure who monitors the behaviour of the housemates, set tasks and punishments and provides the mechanism for contestants to make external requests.

Unlike other versions of Big Brother, housemates would refer to Big Brother as if it was one person. Over the course of the series, Big Brother developed a dry wit in his interactions with the Housemates. He would also offer to counsel his housemates in need of His wisdom.

Eviction Format
Over the duration of the competition, the Housemates will face nominations and evictions to eliminate housemates from the game. However, over the course of the series, the format regarding evictions has changed.

Original Format
For Ten's and Nine's iterations of the series, the format of the show resembled the original Dutch version of the show - a format adapted by most versions of the Big Brother format. In this format, the competitive aspects are minimised - The eviction decisions were determined by viewer voting, Housemates were not allowed to discuss nominations (at the risk of punishment) and most seasons did not feature any regular competitions for power or safety (with the exceptions being the ‘'Friday Night Games'’ and ‘'Showdowns'’). The main elements of the original format are as follows:

Nominations: Every week, the Housemates would participate in nominations, a secret voting process to determine who would be nominated for eviction that week. Each Housemate nominated two other fellow housemates in the Diary Room, providing full reasons to Big Brother for their nominations. The three or more housemates with the most nominations were nominated and faced Australia's vote
 For Seasons 1-7 and the second half of Season 8; each housemate had 3 nomination points to allocate two housemates - one housemate for two points, and another with one.
 For the first half of season 8; The power over nominations was given the viewers, with viewers voting to save a housemate via televoting and the 3 lowest vote receivers facing a House Eviction Vote.
 For Seasons 9-11; each housemate had 5 Nomination Points to allocate to two housemates - For a 3/2 or 4/1 point allocation.
Eviction: After the nominations are finalised, voting for viewers is open, the Australian public voting via televoting (and in later seasons via social media) to determine the evictee of that week. As the first four seasons aired in New Zealand on a one-day delay, New Zealand viewers could also participate in the eviction voting (and then vote for the eventual winner). Later seasons aired in New Zealand on an extended delay, with New Zealand viewers being unable to vote. 
 For Seasons 1-5 and the second half of season 8; viewers voted to evict a nominee. The nominee with the most votes is evicted.  
 For Seasons 6 and 7; viewers had the option to both save and evict. Both vote tallies would be combined and the nominee with the highest net-evict vote (or lowest net-save vote), is evicted. 
 For the first half of season 8; the housemates voted between Australia's nominees in a similar style to the original nomination vote (3 Eviction Votes to be allocated in a 2/1 vote allocation). The housemate with the most votes is evicted.
 For Seasons 9-11; viewers voted to save a nominee. The nominee with the fewest votes is evicted.
Finale: The final housemates would face a Final Vote to determine the winner of the series.
 For Seasons 1–5; viewers voted to evict between the final 2 housemates. The housemate with the fewest votes is declared the winner.
 For Seasons 6 and 7; viewers had the option to both vote to save and to evict between the final 2 housemates. Both vote tallies would be combined and the housemates with the highest net-save vote (or lowest net-evict vote), is declared the winner. 
 For Season 8; viewers voted to evict between the final 3 housemates. The housemate with the fewest votes is declared the winner.
 For Seasons 9-11; final voting began with the final 5 or 6 housemates with Australia voted to win. Throughout the final week, the housemates with the lowest vote total are progressively evicted until 3 remain for the grand finale. Of the final 3, the finalist with the most votes to win is declared the winner.

Current format
In 2020, Seven Network revamped the format of the series to resemble the format of the American & Canadian editions - with housemates deciding both Nominations and Evictions among themselves. The new format added emphasis to the competitive aspect of surviving the eviction process. As such, the housemates will now be allowed to strategise, politic and collude about the nominations and evictions. However, there will still be key differences compared to the American/Canadian format, most prominently with the Australian public still deciding the eventual winner - rather than being decided by a "Jury" of evicted housemates (as is the case on the American and Canadian show).

 Nominations:  At the start of each round, the housemates compete in a "Nomination Challenge". The winner of the competition has immunity from the next eviction and the power over the nominations. Immediately after the challenge, the winning housemate will be called to the Diary Room by Big Brother to name their nominees, and provide full reasons for their nominations. The number of nominees is determined by how far into the overall game housemates are, as the game starts with three nominees and reduces to two nominees towards the end of the game.
 Eviction: On eviction night, all housemates must vote to evict one of the nominees, with the exception of the nominating housemate (who will only cast a tie-breaker vote, if required), nor do the nominated housemates vote when there are only two nominees (on account of their votes cancelling the other's out). The eviction vote is by secret ballot, with housemates casting their votes orally in the Diary Room to Big Brother, and must provide a reason for their vote. The nominee with the most votes is evicted from the house. 
 Finale: The final three housemates will face Australia's vote to determine the winner. This vote is conducted on a dedicated website, with voters voting for a winner and the finalist with the most votes wins.

Prize money 
The winner of Big Brother Australia receives a cash prize for being the last remaining housemate.

 In Big Brother 1 - Big Brother 3, Big Brother 8 - Big Brother 10 & Big Brother 13, the prize was guaranteed A$250,000. Some seasons only mentioned the grand prize part-way through the series.
  Big Brother 11 & Big Brother 12 also intended to have a A$250,000 prize, but tasks and challenges during both seasons resulted in the prize decreasing. In Big Brother 11, the final prize was A$200,000 and in Big Brother 12 the prize was $234,656.
 In Big Brother 4, the prize money was a guaranteed A$1,000,000.
 In Big Brother 5 and Big Brother 6 continued to offer the A$1,000,000, but introduced a fine system. The winner of Big Brother 5 received $836,000, while the winner of Big Brother 6 received $426,000.
 Big Brother 7 was advertised as having no prize money. When the series began, it was revealed the grand prize would be based on the Household's completion of weekly tasks. The money earned for the grand prize was $450,000.
 In both celebrity spin-offs, Celebrity Big Brother Australia and Big Brother VIP Australia, the winner was awarded $100,000 to the charity of their choice.

Tasks & Missions
During their time in the house, housemates are given tasks by Big Brother.

Punishments 
Big Brother 5 introduced a fines system in which the $1,000,000 cash prize was decreased by $5,000 each time housemates violated a rule of Big Brother. The house used for the 6th season featured a Punishment Room, where housemates would sometimes be sent to be punished in addition to the $5,000 fine. In Big Brother 7, some changes were made. These monetary fines were subtracted from the household budget rather than from the prize money, while the Punishment Room remained.

In Big Brother 9 there was a small, rectangular-shaped room, linked to the lounge. This room was the Naughty Corner. This room was similar to the Punishment Room of the sixth and seventh series. The eighth and ninth series' featured no fines system at all. Instead, Big Brother used the original striking system more frequently that meant when a housemate received three strikes they were evicted.

Intruders 
Most seasons of Big Brother Australia usually includes "Intruders". Intruders are new housemates added to the house by the show's producers as ongoing housemates after the series has started. Intruders will be eligible to win the series but will often face a special "Intruder Eviction" shortly after their entrance to the house (either by House Vote, Australia's vote or some combination of both).

Big Brother in Australia

Network Ten iteration (2001–08)
The first Australian series began to broadcast on 23 April 2001. It was hosted by Gretel Killeen from 2001 to 2007. In late 2007 it was announced that Gretel Killeen would not host the show for its 2008 return as part of a revamp of the formula.

In 2008, Big Brother returned for its eighth season with hosts Kyle Sandilands and Jackie O. Ten's chief programmer David Mott admitted the series had recently experienced "audience erosion" inherent with the show's long run. Mott defended the new hosts saying that the ratings for eviction shows held up.

Mike Goldman provided narration and voice-overs for all eight seasons.

First hiatus
Big Brother Australia was axed by Network Ten on 14 July 2008 with the broadcaster confirming that the 2008 season would be the last to air on the channel. A decrease in ratings for the daily shows was cited as the reason for Network Ten opting not to renew its contract for another season.

After the show was axed in 2008, there were many rumours about a possible revival by Nine, Seven, Ten, or SBS. SBS Programmer Shawn White denied the show would be revived on their channel despite rumours with Nine CEO David Gyngell notably 'interested' in the idea soon after the cancellation, only to turn it down days later. The Seven Network expressed interest since bidding for the show after the seventh-season finale; however, denied any and all revival occurring a week after the 2008 finale on morning program Sunrise.

Most notably, Network Ten expressed some interest in the format when on 3 June 2011, News Limited posted an article suggesting the network may be interested in putting it on its digital channel, Eleven. In the article, Chief Programming Officer David Mott stated that "...Ten have considered ways to bring the show back on a number of occasions'; however, was worried that audiences had 'moved on'. Made mention was the US version where the show has had 12 successful seasons, and a thirteenth on the way." Mott said; "It's a summer show for CBS, it doesn't play in the heart of the ratings season but it's done a pretty good job for them."

Nine Network iteration (2012–14)
On 9 September 2011, it was reported and later confirmed that the Nine Network had signed a deal with Southern Star Group to bring the Australian version of Big Brother back. On 22 February 2012 it was confirmed that Dreamworld will be used again as the location for the 2012 series.

The first episode of the revived series premiered on 13 August 2012 with its daily show airing five nights a week at a family-friendly timeslot of 7pm.

After a successful season in 2012, Nine confirmed that the series would be renewed for Season 10 in 2013 during their Nine Network 2013 promotion & during the 2013 finale, host Sonia Kruger confirmed the series renewal for Season 11 in 2014 formally opening auditions.

Second hiatus

In 2018, "Big Brother" returned to Australia as Nine confirmed they would air the first season of Celebrity Big Brother US. Nine created a special logo for the show resembling the eye logo of Nine's iteration of Big Brother Australia that previously aired on the network. Episodes were "fast-tracked" and available on their streaming service 9Now shortly after their American airing with televised broadcast on 9Go! starting 11 February 2018. Due to low ratings episodes were moved from the 9:30pm timeslot to 11:30pm effective 14 February 2018. No further American seasons of Big Brother aired.

On 1 April 2018, a highly publicised April Fools prank by the Australian television news blog TV Tonight reported the return of Big Brother on Ten with Lisa Wilkinson to host.

Seven Network iteration (2020–present) 
On 23 October 2019, Seven Network confirmed it will be reviving the series in 2020. Rumors indicate the series will be closer in format to the American & Canadian versions - particularly given the upfronts trailer featured footage from Big Brother US 17, Big Brother Canada 2 and Big Brother Canada 3 as well as the emphasis on the phrase "Control, Evict, Win" in the promo.

The reboot has been compared to Survivor - in which the politicking and strategising regarding the Nomination and Eviction processes is  allowed (being disallowed in earlier iterations) and central to the format, with Housemates directly voting each other out of the house. Seven's Director of Programming Angus Ross confirmed there would be no live shows on 26 October. It was announced on 5 February 2020 that Sonia Kruger will return to host Big Brother. The show was renewed for a 13th season (the second with 7) on the 28th of June, 2020.

In October 2021, the series was confirmed to return for its 3rd main season with Seven and 14th overall. In celebration of Big Brother Australia's 21st anniversary, season 14 would have former Housemates from all eras of the show returning to compete against new Housemate. A second VIP edition was also confirmed, and as well as Big Brother Canada being made available to stream in Australia on 7plus.

Series details and viewership

Location

First house (2001–2014) 

The first Big Brother House was located at  near Dreamworld, a theme park in Coomera, a northern suburb of the city of the Gold Coast, Queensland. The house was used for Ten and Nine's iteration of Big Brother. Footage from the house is monitored and edited in Dreamworld Studios. There is also an auditorium where the live audience shows, such as the eviction and finale episodes, were staged. The auditorium was an existing facility at Dreamworld used for live stage shows prior to the first series of Big Brother. It was leased to Endemol Southern Star for the duration of the series each year.

Only slight modifications were made to the interior of the house for the second series and the special Celebrity Big Brother Australia series that were screened in 2002. Subsequent to those series, the interior of the house has been rebuilt or extensively remodelled for each new series. Two separate houses were built for Big Brother 2003, and they were merged twenty-three days into the series when previously hidden connecting rooms were revealed. The fifth series introduced a Friday Night Live games arena. An animal enclosure was added to the side of the compound for the sixth series. It was retained for the seventh series.

During production on the series, visitors could access the Big Brother auditorium and view live footage from the house. This feature was, however, discontinued at the start of the ninth series.

Second house (2020–2021)
As the original house had burned down, Seven Network who currently produce and broadcast the series decided on a new location for the Big Brother House much closer to where production and crew members live. It has been understood the house has been built inside a warehouse which existed during World War II as an artillery shed, with a secondary building (previously used a gym) housing activities and challenges for the housemates. The exact location is  next to the North Head Sanctuary Visitor Centre car park on Sydney Harbour's North Head near Manly. This house has since been pulled down following the 2021 season.

Third house (2021–present)
The third Big Brother house was built at Sydney Olympic Park in the White Pavilion for the 14th season.

Theme music 
The theme music was adapted from the original theme used in the original Big Brother, which aired in the Netherlands. The theme for Big Brother Australia was written by Siew Ooi and 001 Productions in Melbourne. The track is an extended version of the main title theme used in the first two seasons of Big Brother Australia, and tracks heard throughout the seasons that followed are shorter, remixed versions of this track. The original track can sometimes be heard in the background when eviction votes, or the nomination tally in the Nominations show, are shown on screen, or when eviction phone numbers are during a show. In 2008, the theme music was retooled into an electric amplified remix, in counterpart of the format changes that were made that year. Four years later in the 2012 revival of the program, the original theme song returned with a futuristic remix. The theme song was completely absent from the 2020 season.

The title theme was initially released as a single. The track was an extended mix of the main title theme used in the first two seasons, and was released with an acoustic "Diary Room" mix and more trance influenced "Eviction" mix. It barely scraped in the top 50, but was re-released a few months later where it reached #12 on the ARIA charts in 2001 with a B-Side of The Sirens' hit "Don't You Think That It's Strange", which was also co-written by Big Brother 2001 housemates; the Diary Room mix; and an extended version of the Big Brother Uncut theme.

International broadcasts

New Zealand
Between 2001 and 2003, as well during 2005, Big Brother Australia aired on TV2 in New Zealand. The show aired on Prime in 2004. Between 2001 and 2004, the show aired on a one-day delay from the Australian broadcast. As such New Zealand viewers had the ability to cast eviction votes to determine the weekly evictee, however this did not continue in 2005 as the show aired on a three-week delay long after voting in Australia had concluded.

The show returned to New Zealand, as part of the TV3 summer line-up in November 2013 with the tenth season of the show. The following eleventh season was also broadcast by TV3 in November 2014.

The show then returned to New Zealand and TV3, which has since rebranded as Three, with the Seven iteration of the show in June 2020. This marked the first time the show has aired in primetime in New Zealand since the conclusion of the 2004 season due to the network needing to fill a scheduling gap caused by the COVID-19 pandemic delaying The Block NZ's ninth season to 2021. On 14 July 2020, it was announced due to low ratings, the show would be moving into a later timeslot and would drop to airing two episodes per week.

The second season to air on Seven was broadcast online-only, via TVNZ OnDemand, starting 4 May 2021 with the first four episodes and each subsequent episodes being released within 48 hours of the Australian broadcast.

Finland
The 2020 edition of the show was also broadcast on Finnish streaming service Ruutu.fi from 6 December 2020, with two episodes airing every Sunday.

The Netherlands
Dutch broadcaster RTL revealed that they are going to broadcast Big Brother Australia from season 12 on RTL 5, starting from 9 April 2021, only one day after their Dutch-Flemish version ended. The broadcast would occur each weekday at 9:30 pm.

United States
In the United States, seasons 12 and 13 were added to Paramount+ on 16 February 2022.

Companion shows

Reception

Criticism and controversy 
The series received some criticism from commentators and audiences for its sexual content. The series was occasionally referred to as "Big Brothel" in the press, in reference to the sexual content of the Uncut episode. Criticism was also voiced in the Australian Government, with one politician referring to it as "toxic television". Complaints about Uncut led to it being rebranded Big Brother: Adults Only for the 2006 season. Adults Only was cancelled early in the season due to continuing controversy.

Censorship and sexual content
After the 2005 series, complaints prompted the Australian Communications and Media Authority to launch an investigation into Big Brother: Uncut. The main complaint was that Network Ten had breached the industry code of practice by broadcasting footage that went past the maximum MA15+ rating for Australian commercial television.

The ACMA found Network Ten had breached the code on a number of occasions:

The airing of housemate Michael massaging his penis on Gianna's back and hair, allegedly without her consent. Gretel Killeen later expressed her disapproval with Michael's indecent actions (BB 2005).
Vesna Tosevska plucking her pubic hair in bed (BB 2005).
A song about sexual fetishes (BB 2005).
Tim hogtied and dumped in the diary room, where he was tackled and had his testicles hit with a leather strap (BB 2005).
Airing of housemates Glenn Dallinger and Michelle Carew-Gibson appearing to have sex in a sauna (BB 2005). 
In the 2001 season, Big Brother Uncut received backlash for airing a ‘sex scene’ between Peter Timbs and Christina Davis, though neither of the two were having sex, despite making rhythmic sexual movements under the bedsheets. 
A 'bondage' party earlier in the 2001 season caused concerns when housemate Andrea Silva, a dominatrix in profession, displayed some of her sexual fetishes to the other housemates, where she tied up her shirtless male housemates, pinched their nipples and lashed them with a scourge. 
Later that night, Sara-Marie Fedele tied up Gordon Sloan on a wooden table and sensually stroke his bare chest.

The ACMA did not impose any direct punishment on Network Ten, however outlined requirements for the 2006 series of Uncut. Included in those requirements is a commitment by Network Ten to compile episode footage early enough for censors to evaluate it. Two censors were taken on by the network specifically for Big Brother, and crew were trained on the restrictions of the MA15+ television rating. As a result of criticism, the show was renamed Big Brother: Adults Only for the 2006 season.

The daily shows in the first 4 seasons were rated G, despite their (mild) sexual references or innuendos and adult subject matter. The daily shows in the latter seasons were rated PG. Late Night Feast, an adult-oriented show first aired in the 2013 season, was rated M for moderate sexual references, (non-graphic) nudity and coarse language.

2006 alleged sexual assault controversy 

On 1 July 2006 two housemates, Michael Cox (using the alias Ashley for the show) and Michael Bric (using the alias John), were removed from the house for allegedly sexually assaulting, "Turkey slapping" female housemate, Camilla Halliwell, in a season of the series that had already attracted significant controversy. Following the incident the live feed was temporarily replaced by an old UpLate update of the housemates completing their football task, continuously looped, and the forums on the Big Brother website were removed. Queensland Police were shown the relevant footage, but opted not to conduct a criminal investigation. Subsequent to this incident former housemate Rita Lazzarotto reported that she had been subjected to a similar incident during her time in the Big Brother house in the 2005 series.

Then Australian Prime Minister John Howard asked for Big Brother to be cancelled, saying, "Here's a great opportunity for Channel 10 to do a bit of self-regulation and get this stupid program off the air"; Leader of the Opposition Kim Beazley and Senator Steve Fielding supported this view. Queensland Premier Peter Beattie argued that the show employed many Australians in production and that, because of the already diminished size of the Australian television industry, the show should continue.

Housemate selection 
The show's producers aim to get "real people" in the house. This has been done by personality testing, engaging with people around the country and appearances. While there are housemates who are "unique" and reflect many diverse people in Australia, there has been a high number of individuals in the latter seasons who come from a modelling background which has alienated them from the public audience.

In the 2007 season, to lower censorship controversies that stemmed from the housemates' generally salacious and revelling personality types from the previous seasons, producers selected more sophisticated, reserved and modest type of housemates, such as Rebecca Dent, a devout Mormon, and Jamie McDonald, a computer geek. Such practise of selecting more educated and mature type of people continued into the latter seasons, with other examples being Michael Beveridge from the 2012 season, who had the IQ of a genius, and Priya Malik, an Indian Australian schoolteacher with an English Honours degree from the 2014 season.

Awards and nominations

Other media 
On 8 July 2003, a DVD entitled Big Brother: Unseen/Uncut/Unreel by Columbia TriStar Home Entertainment, featuring risqué moments from the series was released and became marginally successful. It was rated M which means that the DVD requires a mature perspective, however there is no legal restriction on access. The DVD is broken down into three sections. Unseen showed Launch and Eviction episodes, while Uncut features clips from Big Brother Uncut; speaks of how television censorship laws of different countries that have Big Brother seasons that differ from Australia's; footage of the audition process; and a package where Peter Abbott, the voice of Big Brother for the first three seasons, was "Big Brother'd" for a day, where a camera followed him from the time he woke up to when he went to sleep. Unreel section has information on the first three seasons' housemates, including Big Brother 2003's housemates' introduction packages shown at In They Go; an image gallery with information on what the 24 original housemates of the first two seasons were doing at the time of the DVD's release; and an interactive tour of Big Brother 2003's Houses before and after they were merged.

Notable contestants 

 2001
 Rachel Corbett
 Christina Davis
 Sara-Marie Fedele
 Blair McDonough

 2002
 Nathan Morris
 Brodie Young

 2003
 Regina Bird
 Chrissie Swan

 2004
 Bree Amer
 Wesley Dening
 Ryan Fitzgerald

 2005
 Tim Brunero
 Simon Deering
 Greg and David Mathew

 2006
 Danielle Foote
 Krystal Forscutt

 2007
 Jamie McDonald

 2008
 Craig Barnett
 Michael Crafter

 2013
 Ed Lower

 2014
 Sam Bramham

 2020
 Daniel Gorringe

 2021
 Nick Benton
 Jess Trend

See also 
 List of Australian television series

References

Bibliography

External links 
 Big Brother Australia
 

 
Seven Network original programming
Network 10 original programming
Nine Network original programming
Television shows set in Gold Coast, Queensland
2001 Australian television series debuts
2008 Australian television series endings
2012 Australian television series debuts
2014 Australian television series endings
2020 Australian television series debuts
Television series by Endemol Australia
Television series by Endemol
Australian television series revived after cancellation
English-language television shows
Dreamworld (Australia)
Australian television series based on Dutch television series